Blood of the Railroad Workers is a 1979 Norwegian drama film directed by Erik Solbakken, starring Nils Ole Oftebro and Ragnhild Hilt. A group of rallare (migratory rail road workers) arrive in a small town in Norway, and cause social conflict. One of the men, Sjugur (Oftebro), stands apart as a strong, independent man. The girls like him, but he has set his sights on Innbranna (Hilt), the daughter of a wealthy landowner.

External links
 
 Rallarblod at Filmweb.no (Norwegian)

1979 films
1979 drama films
Norwegian drama films
1970s Norwegian-language films